Elachista bromella is a moth in the family Elachistidae. It was described by Pierre Chrétien in 1915. It is found in Algeria.

References

Moths described in 1915
bromella
Moths of Africa